Zeina Yazigi is a Syrian journalist, news agency reporter and television news anchor. She is now a news anchor at Asharq News.

Career
Yazigi was born on 2 April 1975 in Latakia. Her father was a doctor and her mother had studied at the Sorbonne in Paris. Yazigi earned a BA in English Literature from Tishreen University in Latakia, and a degree in media from the Lebanese American University.

She started working for Reuters and then for the Associated Press in its Beirut bureau. Then, she became a reporter for CNBC in Syria. She, later, moved to Syrian Television as a presenter of political programs for a year and a half. She worked as an anchor for Al Arabiya starting from 2003. She presented the weekly political program Tahta Al-Daw (Under the Light) on Al Arabiya. She left Al-Arabiya in 2011 as a result of the Syrian uprising, and joined Dubai TV where she produced and anchored the political talk show The Arab Street. Later on, she moved to Sky News Arabia where she produced and hosted the political talk show  ('Frankly'), until 2017.

Yazigi is active in campaigning for refugees and has worked as a consultant for UNHCR.

Yazigi was named one of the 100 Most Powerful Arab Women by Arabian Business magazine in 2013.

In November 2020, Yazigi started working for the newly established Asharq News.

Personal life
She married the Syrian actor  in 2002; they have a daughter and a son.

References

External links
 Zeina Yazigi's official Facebook page

1975 births
Living people
Syrian women journalists
20th-century Syrian writers
21st-century Syrian writers
Syrian journalists
Syrian Christians
Al Arabiya people
Lebanese American University alumni
Tishreen University alumni
People from Latakia
20th-century Syrian women writers
21st-century Syrian women writers